The Aberto Santa Catarina de Tenis is a professional tennis tournament played on outdoor red clay courts. It is currently part of the ATP Challenger Tour. It was annually held in Florianópolis, Brazil from 2006 to 2008. It was then moved to Blumenau, Brazil, since 2009.

Past finals

Singles

Doubles

References

External links 
Official website
ITF search

 
ATP Challenger Tour
Clay court tennis tournaments
Sport in Florianópolis
Tennis tournaments in Brazil
2006 establishments in Brazil
Recurring sporting events established in 2006